David Mycoe (born 1 May 1972) is an English former professional rugby league footballer who played in the 1990s and 2000s.

Playing career
Mycoe made his début for Sheffield Eagles in the 1989–90 season, aged 17. He played , and scored 2-goals in Sheffield Eagles' 16-29 defeat by Wakefield Trinity in the 1992 Yorkshire County Cup Final during the 1992–93 season at Elland Road, Leeds on Sunday 18 October 1992.

References

External links
Huddersfield extend NFP lead
Huddersfield destroy Leigh
Giants on course for Super League

1972 births
Living people
Dewsbury Rams players
English rugby league players
Hunslet R.L.F.C. players
Newcastle Thunder players
Rugby league five-eighths
Rugby league players from Wakefield
Sheffield Eagles (1984) players
Wakefield Trinity players